Kentucky Route 1526 (KY 1526) is a  state highway in the U.S. State of Kentucky. Its western terminus is at KY 44 in Cupio and its eastern terminus is at KY 44 in Mount Washington.

Major junctions

Gallery

References

1526
1526